The BET Awards Dr. Bobby Jones Best Gospel/Inspirational Award is given to an urban contemporary gospel artist. The winner is determined based on sales and overall quality of content released within the eligibility period. The award was originally titled Best Gospel Artist, but was later renamed to its current title in 2017. Kirk Franklin currently holds the record for this category, with six wins.

Winners and nominees
Winners are listed first and highlighted in bold.

2000s

2010s

2020s

Multiple wins and nominations

Wins

 6 wins
 Kirk Franklin

 4 wins
 Yolanda Adams

 3 wins
 Mary Mary
 Lecrae

 2 wins
 Donnie McClurkin
 Marvin Sapp

Nominations

 15 nominations
 Kirk Franklin

 8 nominations
 Fred Hammond

 7 nominations
 Tamela Mann
 Mary Mary

 6 nominations
 Marvin Sapp
 CeCe Winans

 5 nominations
 Yolanda Adams
 Lecrae
 Donnie McClurkin

 4 nominations
 Deitrick Haddon
 Smokie Norful

 3 nominations
 Erica Campbell
 Trin-I-Tee 5:7
 Kanye West

 2 nominations
 Shirley Caesar
 Byron Cage
 Tasha Cobbs
 The Clark Sisters
 H.E.R.
 Tye Tribbett
 Hezekiah Walker
 Vickie Winans

References

BET Awards